The 2005 Commonwealth of Independent States Cup was the thirteenth edition of the competition between the champions of former republics of Soviet Union. It was won by Lokomotiv Moscow for the first time.

Format 
This edition of the tournament featured a unique one-off format. In attempt to persuade Russian and Ukrainian champions to field their strongest squads, Lokomotiv Moscow and Dynamo Kyiv were given a straight bye to the Semifinal, avoiding Group phase and Quarterfinal. As a result, two of four groups featured only three clubs, and only four group winners advanced to the knock-out round. Ultimately, the change did not make desirable effect on Dynamo, who brought a reserve squad, and the format was reverted since next year.

Participants

 1 Dynamo Kyiv were represented by Dynamo-2 players.
 2 Tbilisi replaced WIT Georgia (2003–04 Georgian champions) and Dinamo Tbilisi (CIS Cup title holders), who declined to participate.

Group stage

Group A
Unofficial table

Official table

Results

Group B

Results

Group C

Results

Group D

Results

Final rounds

Quarterfinals

Semifinals

Finals

Top scorers

External links
2005 CIS Cup at rsssf.com
2005 CIS Cup at football.by
2005 CIS Cup at kick-off.by

2005
2005 in Russian football
2004–05 in Ukrainian football
2004–05 in European football
January 2005 sports events in Russia
2005 in Moscow